3440 or variant, may refer to:

In general
 A.D. 3440, a year in the 4th millennium CE
 3440 BC, a year in the 4th millennium BCE
 3440, a number in the 3000 (number) range

Other uses
 3440 Stampfer, an asteroid in the Asteroid Belt, the 3440th asteroid registered
 Texas Farm to Market Road 3440, a state highway
 GWR 3700 Class 3440 City of Truro (engine #3440), a steam locomotive preserved at the GWR Museum in Swindon

See also

 H.R. 3440 (disambiguation)